Llangunllo (sometimes Llangynllo) is a village and community in central Powys (formerly in Radnorshire), Wales, located about 5 miles west of Knighton. It is named after St Cynllo. The population of the community at the 2011 census was 369.

It is served by Llangynllo railway station.

Governance
The community elects a community council to represent residents' interests. Calling itself Llangunllo & Bleddfa Community Council, it comprises seven community councillors elected from Llangunllo and Bleddfa villages.

An electoral ward in the same name exists, which also includes neighbouring communities. This ward had a population of 1,255 at the 2011 Census.

Images by Percy Benzie Abery

References

External links
Llangunllo.net

Communities in Powys
Villages in Powys